Diamonds Are Forever is the soundtrack by John Barry for the seventh James Bond film of the same name.

"Diamonds Are Forever", the title song with lyrics by Don Black, was the second Bond theme to be performed by Shirley Bassey, after "Goldfinger". The song was also recorded in Italian by Bassey as "Una cascata di diamanti (Vivo di diamanti)" for the Italian version's end credits; this version was only issued on 7-inch single in Italy, and was intended to be included in a (cancelled) 3-CD box set titled Shirley released in 2012.

Track listing
Tracks 13–21 were not released on the original soundtrack.
 "Diamonds Are Forever" (Main Title) – sung by Shirley Bassey
 "Bond Meets Bambi and Thumper"
 "Moon Buggy Ride"
 "Circus, Circus"
 "Death at the Whyte House"
 "Diamonds Are Forever (Source Instrumental)"
 "Diamonds Are Forever (Bond and Tiffany)"
 "Bond Smells a Rat"
 "Tiffany Case"
 "007 and Counting"
 "Q's Trick"
 "To Hell with Blofeld"
 "Gunbarrel and Manhunt"
 "Mr. Wint and Mr. Kidd/ Bond to Holland"
 "Peter Franks"
 "Airport Source/ On the Road"
 "Slumber, Inc."
 "The Whyte House"
 "Plenty, Then Tiffany"
 "Following the Diamonds"
 "Additional and Alternate Cues"

Sampling
The title song is frequently sampled by modern artists:

"Diamonds from Sierra Leone" – a Grammy Award-winning song by hip hop artist Kanye West. Released on July 4, 2005, as the lead single of his second studio album, Late Registration.
" Psychology" by Dead Prez
"Conflict Diamonds" by Lupe Fiasco (2006)
"Dope Dealer" by Meek Mill

See also
 Outline of James Bond
 James Bond music

References

Soundtrack albums from James Bond films
1971 soundtrack albums
EMI Records soundtracks
John Barry (composer) soundtracks